St. Aloysius College, Edathua, is a Government Aided college of higher Education located in Edathua, Alappuzha district, Kerala. It was established in the year 1965.  The college is affiliated with Mahatma Gandhi University.  College offers graduate and post graduate courses in Arts, Science and Commerce.

Departments

Science

Physics
Chemistry
Mathematics
Zoology
Computer Science

Arts and Commerce

Oriental Languages
English
Economics
Physical Education
Commerce

Accreditation
The college is  recognized by the University Grants Commission (UGC).

References

External links

Universities and colleges in Alappuzha district
Educational institutions established in 1965
1965 establishments in Kerala
Arts and Science colleges in Kerala
Colleges affiliated to Mahatma Gandhi University, Kerala